Calamotropha toonderi is a moth in the family Crambidae. It was described by Schouten in 1993. It is found in the Ivory Coast.

References

Endemic fauna of Ivory Coast
Crambinae
Moths described in 1993